Peace River was a provincial electoral district for the Legislative Assembly of British Columbia, Canada.  It made its first appearance in the general election of 1933, and its last was in 1953.

Demographics

Geography

History

Member of Legislative Assembly

Electoral history 
Note:  Winners of each election are in bold.

 
|Co-operative Commonwealth Fed.
|Mervin Cecil Simmons
|align="right"|800 		 	
|align="right"|31.19%
|align="right"|
|align="right"|unknown
 
|Liberal
|Wallace Archibald Watson
|align="right"|749 	
|align="right"|29.20%
|align="right"|
|align="right"|unknown
|- bgcolor="white"
!align="right" colspan=3|Total valid votes
!align="right"|2,565
!align="right"|100.00%
!align="right"|
|- bgcolor="white"
!align="right" colspan=3|Total rejected ballots
!align="right"|19
!align="right"|
!align="right"|
|- bgcolor="white"
!align="right" colspan=3|Turnout
!align="right"|%
!align="right"|
!align="right"|
|}

 
|Liberal
|Glen Everton Braden
|align="right"|1,168
|align="right"|42.61%
|align="right"|
|align="right"|unknown
 
|Co-operative Commonwealth Fed.
|Charles Wilmer Bumstead
|align="right"|905 	 		 	
|align="right"|33.02%
|align="right"|
|align="right"|unknown

|Independent
|Clive Montgomery Francis Planta
|align="right"|234 	
|align="right"|8.54%
|align="right"|
|align="right"|unknown
|- bgcolor="white"
!align="right" colspan=3|Total valid votes
!align="right"|2,741 	
!align="right"|100.00%
!align="right"|
|- bgcolor="white"
!align="right" colspan=3|Total rejected ballots
!align="right"|34
!align="right"|
!align="right"|
|- bgcolor="white"
!align="right" colspan=3|Turnout
!align="right"|%
!align="right"|
!align="right"|
|}

 
|Co-operative Commonwealth Fed.
|Joseph Hardcastle Corsbie
|align="right"|1,682
|align="right"|47.85%
|align="right"|
|align="right"|unknown

|- bgcolor="white"
!align="right" colspan=3|Total valid votes
!align="right"|3,515  	
!align="right"|100.00%
!align="right"|
|- bgcolor="white"
!align="right" colspan=3|Total rejected ballots
!align="right"|27
!align="right"|
!align="right"|
|- bgcolor="white"
!align="right" colspan=3|Turnout
!align="right"|%
!align="right"|
!align="right"|
|- bgcolor="white"
!align="right" colspan=7|2  Publisher/editor of the Alaska Highway News and wife of George Matheson Murray, formerly MLA for Lillooet (1933–1941) and later MP for Cariboo.
|}

 
|Liberal
|Glen Everton Braden
|align="right"|1,425   	 		
|align="right"|26.14%
|align="right"| - 
|align="right"| -.- %
|align="right"|
|align="right"|unknown
 
|Co-operative Commonwealth Fed.
|Arthur Roald Dahlen
|align="right"|1,571        			 	 		 	
|align="right"|28.82%
|align="right"|1,865
|align="right"|38.80%
|align="right"|
|align="right"|unknown
 
|Progressive Conservative
|Walter Clarence Henderson
|align="right"|278    		 	
|align="right"|5.10%
|align="right"| - 
|align="right"| -.- %
|align="right"|
|align="right"|unknown

|- bgcolor="white"
!align="right" colspan=3|Total valid votes
!align="right"|5,452  	  	
!align="right"|100.00%
|align="right"|4,807
|align="right"|
|align="right"|
|- bgcolor="white"
!align="right" colspan=3|Total rejected ballots
!align="right"|151
!align="right"|
!align="right"|
!align="right"|
!align="right"|
|- bgcolor="white"
!align="right" colspan=3|Turnout
!align="right"|%
!align="right"|
!align="right"|
!align="right"|
!align="right"|
|- bgcolor="white"
!align="right" colspan=7|3 Preferential ballot.  First and final counts of three (3) shown only.
|}

 
|Co-operative Commonwealth Fed.
|Arthur Roald Dahlen
|align="right"|1,921 	 	 	        			 	 		 	
|align="right"|33.24%
|align="right"|2,216
|align="right"|42.31%
|align="right"|
|align="right"|unknown

 
|Liberal
|Stanley Weston
|align="right"|1,378 	     			 	 		 	
|align="right"|23.84%
|align="right"| - 
|align="right"| -.- %
|align="right"|
|align="right"|unknown
 
|Progressive Conservative
|Walter Clarence Henderson
|align="right"|278    		 	
|align="right"|5.10%
|align="right"| - 
|align="right"| -.- %
|align="right"|
|align="right"|unknown
|- bgcolor="white"
!align="right" colspan=3|Total valid votes
!align="right"|5,780 	  		 	  	
!align="right"|100.00%
|align="right"|5,238 
|align="right"|
|align="right"|
|- bgcolor="white"
!align="right" colspan=3|Total rejected ballots
!align="right"|316
!align="right"|
!align="right"|
!align="right"|
!align="right"|
|- bgcolor="white"
!align="right" colspan=3|Turnout
!align="right"|%
!align="right"|
!align="right"|
!align="right"|
!align="right"|
|- bgcolor="white"
!align="right" colspan=7|4 Preferential ballot.  First and final counts of twp (2) shown only.
|}

After the 1953 election the Peace River riding was partitioned into North Peace River and South Peace River.

Former provincial electoral districts of British Columbia
Peace River Country